The Praguerie was a revolt of the French nobility against King Charles VII from February to July 1440.

It was so named because a similar rising had recently taken place in Prague, Bohemia, at that time closely associated with France through the House of Luxembourg, kings of Bohemia. Its causes lay in the reforms of Charles VII at the close of the Hundred Years' War, by which he sought to diminish the anarchy in France and its brigand-soldiery.  The ordinances passed by the estates of langue d'oïl at Orléans in 1439 not only gave the king an aid of 100,000 francs (an act which was later used by the king as though it were a perpetual grant and so freed him from that parliamentary control of the purse so important in England), but demanded as well royal nominations to officerships in the army, marking a gain in the royal prerogative which the nobility resolved to challenge.

The main instigator was Charles I, Duke of Bourbon, who three years before had attempted a similar rising, and had been forced to ask pardon of the king. He and his bastard brother, John, were joined by the former favourite Georges de la Tremoille, John VI, duke of Brittany, who allied himself with the English, the duke of Alençon, the count of Vendôme, and mercenaries captains like Rodrigo de Villandrando, Antoine de Chabannes, or Jean de la Roche. The duke of Bourbon won over the dauphin Louis—afterwards Louis XI—then only sixteen years old, and proposed to set aside the king in his favour, making him regent.

Louis was readily induced to rebel; but the country was saved from a serious civil war by the energy of the king's officers and the solid loyalty of his "good cities". The constable de Richemont marched with the king's troops into Poitou, his old battleground with de la Tremoille, and in two months he had subdued the country. The royal artillery battered down the feudal strongholds. The dauphin and the duke of Alençon failed to bring about any sympathetic rising in Auvergne, and the Praguerie was over, except for some final pillaging and plundering in Saintonge and Poitou, which the royal army failed to prevent.

Charles then attempted to ensure the loyalty of the duke of Bourbon by the gift of a large pension, forgave all the rebellious gentry, and installed his son in Dauphiné. The ordinance of Orleans was enforced. The dauphin was forced to beg his father's forgiveness.

Notes

References
 

1440s in France
1440 in Europe
Rebellions in France
Medieval rebellions in Europe
Conflicts in 1440
15th-century rebellions